He Walked Through the Fields is a 1967 Israeli drama directed by Yosef Millo.  It was based on a popular novel and play by Moshe Shamir and filmed on Kibbutz Galil Yam.

Plot
In 1946, Uri (Assi Dayan) returns to his kibbutz after 2 years of studying.  He begins to feel alienated after discovering that his mother is having an affair with an outsider and his father has joined the British army.  He meets Mika (Iris Yotvat), a young Holocaust survivor from Poland who is finding it difficult to adjust to kibbutz life, and soon falls in love with her.  With Israel on the verge of statehood, and despite Mika's objections, Uri joins the Palmach, the pre-state Jewish underground militia, leading his men on missions and maneuvers without being aware of Mika's pregnancy.  Uri volunteers for a dangerous military operation and is killed while blowing up a bridge controlled by the British.  His parents receive the tragic news, but are comforted by the grandchild that is to be born to them.

Critical reception
The film received generous financial support, and became one of the major events celebrating Israel's twentieth anniversary.  The Prime Minister at the time, Levi Eshkol, as well as ministers and other public figures attended the premiere.

Although it garnered mixed reviews, the film had a good box office (selling some 320,000 tickets) and a significant cultural impact.  This was Assi Dayan's debut role and it made him into an Israeli film icon.

The film has received attention in scholarship from writers like Nurith Gertz and Ella Shohat. Shohat, writing about the film's heroic protagonist, noting that in Hebrew language gibor (hero), gever (man), gvura (bravery), ligvor (to conquer, to overpower), and ligvor al (to win) all share the etymological root GBR, reflecting closely linked concepts of bravery, mastery and masculinity which were part of the Israeli "heroic-nationalist" films of this generation.

References

External links
 

1967 films
Israeli drama films
1960s Hebrew-language films
Films about the kibbutz
1967 drama films